Banikhet is located about seven kilometers from Dalhousie, India. It is an important centre of tourism in the Chamba district.

Geography
It has daytime temperature of 25 °C and night temperature of about 15 °C during summers.

Tourism
Banikhet is home to a number of tourist attractions, including the Historical Naag Mandir, Jawala Mata Mandir and Helipad. The town's profile has been raised with the establishment of NHPC Ltd.'s Chamera Hydro-Electric Project.

Education
Banikhet has around four schools, including Kendriya Vidyalaya Sangathan and the only college (DAV) in area.

References

Villages in Chamba district